"Heartache Medication" is a song co-written and recorded by American country music singer Jon Pardi. It was released on May 20th 2019 as the lead single to, and title track from, his third studio album Heartache Medication. Pardi wrote the song with Natalie Hemby and Barry Dean. Heartache Medication gave Pardi his third number-one hit on the Billboard Country Airplay chart. It also peaked at numbers five and 42 on both the Hot Country Songs and Hot 100 charts respectively. The song was certified Platinum by the Recording Industry Association of America (RIAA), and has sold 82,000 copies in the United States as of March 2020. It achieved similar success in Canada, reaching number one on the Country chart and number 72 on the Canadian Hot 100 chart. It was certified Platinum by Music Canada, denoting sales of over 80,000 units in that country. A music video for the single features Pardi performing the song while dancing with his girlfriend.

Content and history
Cillea Houghton of Sounds Like Nashville describes the song as "centered around a heartbroken man curing his misery not with anger or spite, but a glass of something strong". Pardi said that the song carries "an '80s George Strait 'Fool Hearted Memory' feel to it, and is something people can dance to."

Commercial performance
"Heartache Medication" reached number one on Billboards Country Airplay on chart dated February 8, 2020, becoming Pardi's third number one on that chart, and his first since "Dirt on My Boots" in March–April 2017. The song was certified platinum by the Recording Industry Association of America (RIAA) on July 30, 2020 for a million units in sales and streams. It has sold 82,000 copies in the United States as of March 2020.

The song reached No. 1 on the Billboard Canada Country chart dated December 28, 2019.

Music video
The music video features Pardi and his girlfriend, Summer Duncan, performing the song while dancing.

Charts

Weekly charts

Year-end charts

Certifications

References

2019 singles
2019 songs
Jon Pardi songs
Capitol Records Nashville singles
Songs written by Jon Pardi
Songs written by Barry Dean (songwriter)
Songs written by Natalie Hemby